Yarumal is a municipality in the Antioquia Department, Colombia.

 
It has a minor basilica, Our Lady of Mercy, which is a parish church of architectural note.

It gave its name to the Yarumal Society for the Foreign Missions (M.X.Y./I.M.E.Y.), a Medellin-based Latin Catholic Society of Apostolic Life of Pontifical Right for Men, which despite its name is especially active in Colombian missions.

History 
Yarumal was founded in 1787 as San Luis de Gongora. Municipal status was granted in 1821.

Name 
The current name of Yarumal comes from a local plant of the family Moraceae, known in botanical Latin as Cecropia peltata L.

Health 

An unusually large proportion of the inhabitants suffer from early-onset Alzheimer's disease, which is caused by the gene mutation E280A. The genetic mutation is thought to have come from a Spanish conquistador. Approximately 5,000 residents will develop early-onset Alzheimer's. Half of the affected residents were shown to have developed symptoms by their early 40s.

Climate
Yarumal has a subtropical highland climate (Cfb). It has heavy rainfall year round.

See also 
 Yarumal climbing salamander, indigenous in Colombia

References 

Municipalities of Antioquia Department